This article is a catalog of actresses and models who appeared on the cover of Harper's Bazaar Argentina, the Argentinian edition of Harper's Bazaar magazine, published from May 2011 to May 2017 and from December 2018 to February 2019.

2011

2012

2013

2014

2015

2016

2017

2018

2019

External links
 Harper's Bazaar Argentina
 Harper's Bazaar Argentina on Models.com

Argentina